The New World (Spanish: Un mundo nuevo) is a 1957 Mexican drama film directed by René Cardona and starring Lorena Velázquez, René Cardona Jr. and Rafael Alcayde.

Cast 
In alphabetical order
 Rafael Alcayde
 Arturo Arias
 René Cardona Jr.
 René Cardona
 Ángel Di Stefani
 Manuel Dondé
 John Kelly
 José Pulido
 Antonio Raxel
 Lorena Velázquez

References

Bibliography 
 Victoria Ruétalo & Dolores Tierney. Latsploitation, Exploitation Cinemas, and Latin America. Routledge, 2009.

External links 
 

1957 films
1957 drama films
Mexican drama films
1950s Spanish-language films
Films directed by René Cardona
1950s Mexican films